Rodney Pampling (born 23 September 1969) is an Australian professional golfer. He currently plays on the PGA Tour Champions, and was a three-time winner on the PGA Tour.

Golf career
Pampling was born in Redcliffe, Queensland. He turned professional in 1994. He began his tournament golf career on the PGA Tour of Australasia, where he won the 1999 Canon Challenge, and also spent time on the NGA Hooters Tour, a developmental tour in the United States. In 2000 and 2001 he played on the PGA Tour's official developmental tour, the Buy.com Tour, now called the Web.com Tour, and did well enough in his second season to gain promotion to the full PGA Tour.

In 1999, Pampling shot a 71 at Carnoustie during the opening round of the Open Championship, leading the field. However, he shot an 86 in the second round to miss the cut.

He achieved his first PGA Tour win at The International in 2004 and his second at the 2006 Bay Hill Invitational, which took him into the top 50 of the Official World Golf Rankings. He continues to play a few events in his home country each year during the northern hemisphere winter. He won the Sportsbet Australian Masters at Huntingdale Golf Club, Melbourne in November 2008, beating Marcus Fraser in a 3-hole playoff after the two players tied at a 12-under par 276. As a European Tour co-sanctioned event, that win also earned him a two-year exemption on that tour. Pampling then became an endorser for AdvoCare, which produces weight management, nutritional supplement, and personal care products.

After a rough 2010, Pampling played the 2011 season with limited status as a past champion and through sponsor invites. He received a lifetime invitation to the AT&T National from tournament director Greg McLaughlin after personally trying to thank each tournament director that gave him a sponsor exemption during the 2011 season. Pampling clawed his way to 124th on the PGA Tour, regaining his Tour card by just over $2,000. Pampling finished the 2012 season 127th on the money list, just missing a PGA Tour card by two spots and $26,617. From 2013 to 2015, Pampling alternated between the PGA Tour and Web.com Tour.

Pampling won the Web.com Tour's BMW Charity Pro-Am in 2015 and regained his PGA Tour card through the Web.com Tour Finals in 2015 and 2016. He earned his first PGA Tour win in ten years at the 2016 Shriners Hospitals for Children Open. A clerical error allowed Pampling and eleven other golfers entry into the field, increasing the field from 132 to 144.

Professional wins (8)

PGA Tour wins (3)

European Tour wins (1)

1Co-sanctioned by the PGA Tour of Australasia

European Tour playoff record (1–0)

PGA Tour of Australasia wins (2)

1Co-sanctioned by the European Tour

PGA Tour of Australasia playoff record (1–0)

Web.com Tour wins (1)

Web.com Tour playoff record (0–2)

Other wins (1)

Other playoff record (1–0)

PGA Tour Champions wins (1)

Results in major championships

CUT = missed the half-way cut
"T" = tied

Summary

Most consecutive cuts made – 4 (2003 PGA – 2005 Masters)
Longest streak of top-10s – 1

Results in The Players Championship

CUT = missed the halfway cut
"T" indicates a tie for a place

Results in World Golf Championships
Results not in chronological order before 2015.

1Cancelled due to 9/11

QF, R16, R32, R64 = Round in which player lost in match play
"T" = tied
NT = No tournament
Note that the HSBC Champions did not become a WGC event until 2009.

Results in senior major championships

"T" indicates a tie for a place
NT = No tournament due to COVID-19 pandemic

See also
2001 Buy.com Tour graduates
2015 Web.com Tour Finals graduates
2016 Web.com Tour Finals graduates

References

External links

Rod Pampling player profile, Golf Australia

Australian male golfers
PGA Tour of Australasia golfers
PGA Tour golfers
European Tour golfers
Korn Ferry Tour graduates
Golfers from Brisbane
Sportsmen from Queensland
People from Flower Mound, Texas
1969 births
Living people
20th-century Australian people
21st-century Australian people